Alyssa Renee Peterson (February 29, 1976 – September 15, 2003) was a United States Army soldier, with Arabic language certification, who served with C Company, 311th Military Intelligence Battalion, 101st Airborne in Iraq. Peterson graduated from Northern Arizona University, after which she enlisted in the U.S. Army and attended the Defense Language Institute in California, where she learned Arabic. She also studied interrogation techniques at Fort Huachuca, Cochise County, Arizona.

Early life and education

In the late 1990s Peterson became fluent in Dutch before serving an 18-month mission in the Netherlands for the Church of Jesus Christ of Latter-day Saints. Peterson later graduated from Northern Arizona University in May 2001 with a bachelor of arts degree in psychology. She enlisted in the U.S. Army in July 2001 and excelled in Arabic courses at the Defense Language Institute in Monterey, California.

Career
Peterson was transferred to Fort Campbell, Kentucky in July 2003 before her deployment to the Middle East sometime thereafter. She was assigned to C Company, 311th Military Intelligence Battalion of the 101st Airborne Division.

Death
Radioed in to the Tactical Operations Center at 0900 on September 16, an unidentified aircraft reported visual sighting of a body near the Third Brigade Landing Zone (LZ). After further investigation, it was determined that on September 15, 2003, Alyssa Peterson died from a "non-hostile weapons discharge" at the Tal Afar airbase on the Syrian-Iraqi frontier. Subsequent investigation revealed that she had been placed under suicide watch after refusing further participation in interrogation sessions at a location known as "the cage". Techniques used there she had said constituted torture of Iraqi prisoners.

According to a report into the investigation into her death:

Just before her death, Peterson spoke to another intelligence specialist, Kayla Williams, about her concerns. According to the Huffington Post, Williams also was forced to take part in torture interrogations during which detainees were assaulted, stripped, blindfolded, and then confronted with a female interrogator. It is also reported that interrogation included cramped confinement, stress position, sleep deprivation, insects placed in a confinement box and waterboarding. She refused to participate in this.

Peterson's body was returned to Flagstaff, Arizona in late September 2003, where she was buried with full military honors at Citizens Cemetery.

See also
Torture by the United States

Bibliography

References

External links
 
 Alyssa Peterson at MilitaryTimes
 Alyssa Peterson at TogetherWeServed

1976 births
2003 suicides
American military personnel who committed suicide
Women in the Iraq War
Women in the United States Army
Suicides by firearm in Iraq
American Latter Day Saints
Defense Language Institute alumni
Northern Arizona University alumni
United States Army personnel of the Iraq War
American military personnel killed in the Iraq War
American Mormon missionaries in the Netherlands
Female Mormon missionaries
2003 deaths